Irgiz may refer to:

 Bolshoy Irgiz, a river in Russia
 Maly Irgiz, a river in Russia
 Irgiz (Turgay), a river in Kazakhstan, tributary of the Turgay
 Yrgyz, a town in Kazakhstan